Camilla Cederna (21 January 1911 – 5 November 1997) was an Italian writer and editor. She is said to have introduced investigative journalism to the Italian news media. Some sources give her year of birth as 1921.

Cederna was born in Milan where she studied Classic Literature at the University of Milan. In 1941 she helped founding the magazine L'Europeo. From 1958 to 1980, she was an editor and reporter for L'espresso; in 1980, she joined Panorama magazine as an editor and columnist. Her 1943 article La moda nera ("Black fashion") about the clothes worn by women in the Italian Fascist movement, originally published in Corriere della Sera on September 7, led to her being put in prison.

Cerderna is perhaps best known for her 1978 book Giovanni Leone: la carriera di un presidente (Giovanni Leone: The Career of a President), where she accused Italian president Giovanni Leone of being involved in a Lockheed bribery scandal; Leone was forced to resign but he later successfully sued Cederna for libel.

She died of cancer in Rome in 1997.

Selected works 
 Noi siamo le signore (We are the ladies) (1958)
 La voce dei padroni (The voices of the bosses) (1962)
 8 1/2 di Federico Fellini (1963)
 Pinelli. Una finestra sulla strage (Pinelli: A window on the carnage) (1971), on the death of railroad worker and anarchist Giuseppe Pinelli
 Sparare a vista. Come la polizia del regime DC mantiene l'ordine pubblico (Shooting on sight: How the police of the Christian Democratic government maintain order) (1975)
 Il mondo di Camilla, autobiography (1980)
 Casa nostra (1983)
 De gustibus (1986)

References 

1911 births
1997 deaths
Italian non-fiction writers
Deaths from cancer in Lazio
Journalists from Milan
University of Milan alumni
20th-century Italian women writers
Italian women editors
Italian women novelists
Italian magazine editors
Italian magazine founders
Italian women journalists
Women magazine editors
20th-century non-fiction writers